L1C is a type of GPS signal.

L1C May also refer to:
League1 Canada, a semi-pro association football (soccer) league in Canada